The Devil's Chimney is a limestone rock formation that stands above a disused quarry in Leckhampton, near Cheltenham, Gloucestershire, England.

It is named for its peculiar shape, that of a crooked and twisted chimney rising from the ground. The Devil's Chimney is a local landmark, but its origins are uncertain. In 1926 it survived an earthquake, but not without a few cracks. In 1985 it was repaired and protected from further erosion.

Local legend 
Legend holds that the Devil's Chimney is the chimney of the Devil's dwelling deep beneath the ground. Supposedly the Devil, provoked by the many Christian churches of the area, would sit atop Leckhampton Hill and hurl stones at Sunday churchgoers. However the stones were turned back on him, driving him beneath the ground and trapping him there so he could not further harass the villagers. Now he uses the mass of stones as his chimney to let free the smokes of hell.

Visitors to the Devil's Chimney would leave a coin on top of the rock as payment to the Devil in exchange for his staying in his underground home and not leaving to create mischief and spread evil in the local area.

Origins 
The 19th-century geologist S. Buckman suggested that the strange shape of the Devil's Chimney could be put down to differential erosion, involving the softer outer rock being worn away to leave only the inner harder rock remaining. However, this would require some explanation of why there was a column of harder rock there in the first place.

The truth is probably that the Devil's Chimney was left behind by 18th-century quarry workers, who quarried around it as a joke.

References

Tourist attractions in Gloucestershire
Cotswolds
Leckhampton